Samu Aleksi Haber (born 2 April 1976) is a Finnish singer, songwriter, television music competition judge, entrepreneur, and is the lead vocalist and frontman of pop-rock band Sunrise Avenue.

Haber established a band Sunrise in 1992 with his friend Jan Hohenthal. Hohenthal left the band in 2002 as he wanted to focus on his solo career. In 2002 Haber changed the band name to Sunrise Avenue. Between 2002 and 2005 Haber visited 102 record companies and agents trying to find a label for Sunrise Avenue's music. The first album was made with financial help from Haber's friend Mikko Virtala, who sold his house to pay the studio costs.

Haber is an Ice Hockey fanatic and his favourite team is Helsingfors IFK. Haber played ice hockey in Espoon Kiekkoseura until the age of 14 as defence-man attending tournaments also in Canada and USA. Haber's other hobbies are kettle bell training and jogging.

Haber's band Sunrise Avenue has released three studio albums selling more than 2,000,000 copies and 2,000,000 singles worldwide. Haber is Sunrise Avenue's main songwriter and he has written all the band's songs either alone or with a producer and cowriter. The last international hit Hollywood Hills Haber wrote alone.

Haber is working as co-manager for new Finnish bands and artists together with the CoMusic Management. Haber owned studio Sonic Kitchen with producers Jukka Backlund and Aku Sinivalo 2007–2010. Haber's military status is Finnish Navy Sergeant.

Haber's father's family is from Germany, but his family has always lived in Finland.

Haber has one sister, Sanna (23 January 1978) and one brother Santtu (29 January 1989).

In 2020, Haber teamed up with Rea Garvey for a duo coaching team on The Voice of Germany, he won the season, but was also a solo coach in 2013, 2014, 2016 and 2017.

Haber presented Uuden Musiikin Kilpailu 2023, Finland's national selection for the Eurovision Song Contest 2023.

Solo career 
Samu Haber´s first single “Enkelten kaupunki” (in English “City of Angels”) was released in 2020. Haber has also written solo songs including: ”Täältä tullaan” (2021), ”Sä” (2022), “Sata vuotta sitten” (2022). Haber´s new solo album ”Pelastetaan maailma” is going to be released in 2022.  

As a solo artist Haber visited the Finnish television program “Vain elämää” season 6 (2017) and season 10 (2019). Some of the songs featured at “Vain Elämää” -show Haber performed with original lyrics and other songs Haber wrote to a new and updated form. He also made singles out of those songs.  

Updated songs (single release): 

2017 (“Vain elämää”, season 6):

“Hiljaisuus” orig. Irina, “Joutsenlaulu” orig. Yö, ”Onnellinen”, orig. Robin Packalen (prev. Robin), “Perjantai 13.” orig. Nikke Ankara, “Satuprinsessa” orig. Tik Tak, ”Kerran” orig. Laura Voutilainen.

2019 (“Vain elämää”, season 10):

“Ikuinen Vappu” orig. JVG, “Hanuri” orig. Antti Tuisku, ”Vanha Sydän” orig. Erin, “Ei kukaan tuu sulta tuntumaan” orig. Jarkko Suo (alias Lauri Tähkä), ”Teguila” orig. Vesala”Tuulettaa” orig. Elastinen, ”Hyvä Ihminen” orig. Timo Rautiainen & Trio Niskalaukaus.

References

External links

 Sunrise Avenue webpage
 Comusic Productions

Living people
21st-century Finnish male singers
Finnish songwriters
Finnish people of German descent
Finnish television presenters
1976 births
20th-century Finnish male singers